The 1969 Pittsburgh Pirates season was a season in American baseball. It consisted of the Pirates finishing in third place in the newly established National League East, twelve games behind the eventual World Series champion New York Mets. The Pirates were managed by Larry Shepard, and played their home games at Forbes Field, which was in its final full season of operation, before moving into their new facility in the middle of the following season.

Offseason 
 October 14, 1968: Manny Mota was drafted from the Pirates by the Montreal Expos as the 2nd pick in the 1968 MLB expansion draft.
 October 14, 1968: Donn Clendenon was drafted from the Pirates by the Montreal Expos as the 11th pick in the 1968 MLB expansion draft.
 October 14, 1968: Maury Wills was drafted from the Pirates by the Montreal Expos as the 21st pick in the 1968 MLB expansion draft.
 October 14, 1968: Dave Roberts was drafted from the Pirates by the San Diego Padres as the 39th pick in the 1968 MLB expansion draft.
 October 14, 1968: Al McBean was drafted from the Pirates by the San Diego Padres as the 50th pick in the 1968 MLB expansion draft.
 October 14, 1968: Ron Slocum was drafted from the Pirates by the San Diego Padres as the 55th pick in the 1968 MLB expansion draft.
 October 16, 1968: George Spriggs was sold by the Pirates to the Kansas City Royals.
 October 21, 1968: Dave Wickersham was sold by the Pirates to the Kansas City Royals.
 January 15, 1969: Manny Jiménez was traded by the Pirates to the Chicago Cubs for Joe Campbell and Chuck Hartenstein.
 February 12, 1969: Rennie Stennett was signed by the Pirates as a non-drafted free agent.
 March 28, 1969: Tommie Sisk and Chris Cannizzaro were traded by the Pirates to the San Diego Padres for Ron Davis and Bobby Klaus.
 March 30, 1969: Omar Moreno was signed by the Pirates as a non-drafted free agent.

Regular season 
August 6, 1969: Willie Stargell hit a home run out of Dodger Stadium.

Season standings

Record vs. opponents

Detailed records

Game log

|- bgcolor="ccffcc"
| 1 || April 8 || @ Cardinals || 6–2 (14) || Dal Canton (1–0) || Nelson || Hartenstein (1) || 38,163 || 1–0
|- bgcolor="ccffcc"
| 2 || April 9 || @ Cardinals || 6–1 || Veale (1–0) || Briles || — || 10,739 || 2–0
|- bgcolor="ccffcc"
| 3 || April 10 || @ Cardinals || 3–2 || Ellis (1–0) || Washburn || — || 10,283 || 3–0
|- bgcolor="ccffcc"
| 4 || April 11 || Phillies || 7–1 || Moose (1–0) || Johnson || — || 31,641 || 4–0
|- bgcolor="ffbbbb"
| 5 || April 12 || Phillies || 1–8 || Jackson || Bunning (0–1) || — || 12,474 || 4–1
|- bgcolor="ccffcc"
| 6 || April 13 || Phillies || 6–5 || Kline (1–0) || Wilson || — || 14,981 || 5–1
|- bgcolor="ffbbbb"
| 7 || April 14 || @ Cubs || 0–4 || Holtzman || Veale (1–1) || — || 3,114 || 5–2
|- bgcolor="ffbbbb"
| 8 || April 15 || @ Cubs || 4–7 || Aguirre || Ellis (1–1) || Abernathy || 4,362 || 5–3
|- bgcolor="ccffcc"
| 9 || April 16 || Mets || 11–3 || Moose (2–0) || Koosman || — || 7,666 || 6–3
|- bgcolor="ccffcc"
| 10 || April 17 || Mets || 4–0 || Bunning (1–1) || Cardwell || Kline (1) || 8,097 || 7–3
|- bgcolor="ccffcc"
| 11 || April 19 || @ Phillies || 8–6 || Blass (1–0) || Jackson || Dal Canton (1) || 3,953 || 8–3
|- bgcolor="ffbbbb"
| 12 || April 20 || @ Phillies || 1–7 || Wise || Veale (1–2) || Lersch || 4,930 || 8–4
|- bgcolor="ccffcc"
| 13 || April 22 || Cubs || 7–5 || Hartenstein (1–0) || Hands || — ||  || 9–4
|- bgcolor="ccffcc"
| 14 || April 22 || Cubs || 6–5 || Dal Canton (2–0) || Nye || Kline (2) || 7,906 || 10–4
|- bgcolor="ffbbbb"
| 15 || April 23 || @ Mets || 0–2 || Koosman || Bunning (1–2) || — || 7,274 || 10–5
|- bgcolor="ccffcc"
| 16 || April 25 || Expos || 8–2 || Blass (2–0) || Morton || Hartenstein (2) || 10,947 || 11–5
|- bgcolor="ccffcc"
| 17 || April 26 || Expos || 4–3 || Veale (2–2) || Stoneman || Hartenstein (3) || 8,372 || 12–5
|- bgcolor="ffbbbb"
| 18 || April 27 || Expos || 2–4 || Jaster || Ellis (1–2) || — || 24,425 || 12–6
|- bgcolor="ffbbbb"
| 19 || April 28 || Cardinals || 2–6 || Carlton || Moose (2–1) || — || 3,859 || 12–7
|- bgcolor="ccffcc"
| 20 || April 30 || Cardinals || 2–1 || Bunning (2–2) || Giusti || — ||  || 13–7
|- bgcolor="ffbbbb"
| 21 || April 30 || Cardinals || 1–8 || Gibson || Blass (2–1) || — || 10,895 || 13–8
|-

|- bgcolor="ffbbbb"
| 22 || May 1 || Cardinals || 3–9 || Briles || Veale (2–3) || — || 7,043 || 13–9
|- bgcolor="ccffcc"
| 23 || May 2 || @ Expos || 7–3 || Ellis (2–2) || Jaster || — || 11,892 || 14–9
|- bgcolor="ccffcc"
| 24 || May 3 || @ Expos || 4–2 || Moose (3–1) || Morton || Hartenstein (4) || 14,147 || 15–9
|- bgcolor="ffbbbb"
| 25 || May 4 || @ Expos || 4–6 || Face || Kline (1–1) || — || 16,931 || 15–10
|- bgcolor="ffbbbb"
| 26 || May 6 || Padres || 2–4 || Kelley || Blass (2–2) || Reberger || 5,793 || 15–11
|- bgcolor="ccffcc"
| 27 || May 7 || Padres || 2–0 || Veale (3–3) || Kirby || Hartenstein (5) || 4,189 || 16–11
|- bgcolor="ffbbbb"
| 28 || May 9 || Dodgers || 3–13 || Singer || Ellis (2–3) || Moeller || 6,837 || 16–12
|- bgcolor="ffbbbb"
| 29 || May 10 || Dodgers || 1–4 || Sutton || Bunning (2–3) || Brewer || 4,979 || 16–13
|- bgcolor="ccffcc"
| 30 || May 12 || Giants || 4–3 || Hartenstein (2–0) || Gibbon || — || 3,396 || 17–13
|- bgcolor="ffbbbb"
| 31 || May 13 || Giants || 8–11 || Herbel || Moose (3–2) || Linzy || 5,846 || 17–14
|- bgcolor="ffbbbb"
| 32 || May 14 || Giants || 0–3 || Marichal || Bunning (2–4) || — || 8,296 || 17–15
|- bgcolor="ffbbbb"
| 33 || May 16 || @ Dodgers || 3–4 || Brewer || Kline (1–2) || — || 19,016 || 17–16
|- bgcolor="ffbbbb"
| 34 || May 17 || @ Dodgers || 0–6 || Osteen || Ellis (2–4) || — || 50,120 || 17–17
|- bgcolor="ffbbbb"
| 35 || May 18 || @ Dodgers || 5–6 || Brewer || Ramos (0–1) || — || 21,086 || 17–18
|- bgcolor="ccffcc"
| 36 || May 20 || @ Padres || 6–3 || Bunning (3–4) || Niekro || Hartenstein (6) || 4,947 || 18–18
|- bgcolor="ccffcc"
| 37 || May 21 || @ Padres || 11–1 || Moose (4–2) || Sisk || — || 34,334 || 19–18
|- bgcolor="ccffcc"
| 38 || May 22 || @ Padres || 7–1 || Blass (3–2) || Kirby || — || 4,001 || 20–18
|- bgcolor="ffbbbb"
| 39 || May 23 || @ Giants || 0–3 || Robertson || Ellis (2–5) || — || 8,217 || 20–19
|- bgcolor="ffbbbb"
| 40 || May 24 || @ Giants || 2–5 || McCormick || Veale (3–4) || — || 18,616 || 20–20
|- bgcolor="ccffcc"
| 41 || May 25 || @ Giants || 2–1 || Bunning (4–4) || Perry || — ||  || 21–20
|- bgcolor="ccffcc"
| 42 || May 25 || @ Giants || 6–2 || Moose (5–2) || Sadecki || Dal Canton (2) || 24,041 || 22–20
|- bgcolor="ffbbbb"
| 43 || May 28 || @ Reds || 6–7 || Carroll || Kline (1–3) || — || 7,458 || 22–21
|- bgcolor="ffbbbb"
| 44 || May 29 || @ Reds || 4–10 || Merritt || Veale (3–5) || — || 8,161 || 22–22
|- bgcolor="ccffcc"
| 45 || May 30 || Astros || 9–3 || Bunning (5–4) || Lemaster || — ||  || 23–22
|- bgcolor="ffbbbb"
| 46 || May 30 || Astros || 6–9 || Billingham || Hartenstein (2–1) || Gladding || 18,381 || 23–23
|- bgcolor="ccffcc"
| 47 || May 31 || Astros || 3–1 || Ellis (3–5) || Ray || Kline (3) || 6,663 || 24–23
|-

|- bgcolor="ccffcc"
| 48 || June 1 || Astros || 14–7 || Blass (4–2) || Wilson || — || 21,023 || 25–23
|- bgcolor="ffbbbb"
| 49 || June 3 || Reds || 3–7 || Merritt || Veale (3–6) || — || 4,576 || 25–24
|- bgcolor="ffbbbb"
| 50 || June 4 || Reds || 3–5 || Carroll || Hartenstein (2–2) || Granger || 6,685 || 25–25
|- bgcolor="ffbbbb"
| 51 || June 6 || @ Braves || 1–3 || Niekro || Ellis (3–6) || — || 17,049 || 25–26
|- bgcolor="ccffcc"
| 52 || June 7 || @ Braves || 10–2 || Blass (5–2) || Jarvis || — || 21,120 || 26–26
|- bgcolor="ffbbbb"
| 53 || June 8 || @ Braves || 10–11 || Niekro || Hartenstein (2–3) || — ||  || 26–27
|- bgcolor="ffbbbb"
| 54 || June 8 || @ Braves || 3–4 || Pappas || Veale (3–7) || — || 27,318 || 26–28
|- bgcolor="ffbbbb"
| 55 || June 10 || @ Astros || 4–7 || Griffin || Ellis (3–7) || — || 14,660 || 26–29
|- bgcolor="ccffcc"
| 56 || June 11 || @ Astros || 13–8 || Blass (6–2) || Guinn || Hartenstein (7) || 15,871 || 27–29
|- bgcolor="ccffcc"
| 57 || June 12 || @ Astros || 4–3 || Bunning (6–4) || Gladding || — || 14,260 || 28–29
|- bgcolor="ccffcc"
| 58 || June 13 || Braves || 2–1 (10) || Dal Canton (3–0) || Pappas || — || 11,610 || 29–29
|- bgcolor="ccffcc"
| 59 || June 14 || Braves || 4–2 || Moose (6–2) || Upshaw || — || 18,283 || 30–29
|- bgcolor="ffbbbb"
| 60 || June 15 || Braves || 4–6 || Reed || Blass (6–3) || Upshaw || 19,974 || 30–30
|- bgcolor="ccffcc"
| 61 || June 16 || Cubs || 9–8 || Dal Canton (4–0) || Regan || Blass (1) || 8,810 || 31–30
|- bgcolor="ccffcc"
| 62 || June 17 || Cubs || 1–0 || Veale (4–7) || Jenkins || Dal Canton (3) ||  || 32–30
|- bgcolor="ccffcc"
| 63 || June 17 || Cubs || 4–3 || Blass (7–3) || Abernathy || — || 26,817 || 33–30
|- bgcolor="ccffcc"
| 64 || June 18 || Cubs || 3–2 (10) || Gibbon (1–0) || Regan || — || 12,198 || 34–30
|- bgcolor="ffbbbb"
| 65 || June 20 || @ Phillies || 7–8 || Wilson || Marone (0–1) || Boozer || 10,669 || 34–31
|- bgcolor="ccffcc"
| 66 || June 21 || @ Phillies || 8–2 || Dal Canton (5–0) || Palmer || — || 5,469 || 35–31
|- bgcolor="ccffcc"
| 67 || June 22 || @ Phillies || 6–0 || Ellis (4–7) || Champion || — ||  || 36–31
|- bgcolor="ffbbbb"
| 68 || June 22 || @ Phillies || 2–3 || Jackson || Blass (7–4) || — || 33,712 || 36–32
|- bgcolor="ffbbbb"
| 69 || June 23 || @ Cubs || 4–5 || Regan || Dal Canton (5–1) || — || 12,500 || 36–33
|- bgcolor="ffbbbb"
| 70 || June 24 || @ Cubs || 2–3 || Hands || Bunning (6–5) || — || 17,530 || 36–34
|- bgcolor="ffbbbb"
| 71 || June 25 || @ Cubs || 2–5 || Jenkins || Veale (4–8) || — || 26,434 || 36–35
|- bgcolor="ffbbbb"
| 72 || June 26 || @ Cubs || 5–7 (10) || Regan || Dal Canton (5–2) || — || 29,473 || 36–36
|- bgcolor="ccffcc"
| 73 || June 27 || @ Mets || 3–1 || Blass (8–4) || Koosman || Gibbon (1) || 42,276 || 37–36
|- bgcolor="ccffcc"
| 74 || June 28 || @ Mets || 7–4 || Bunning (7–5) || Gentry || Gibbon (2) || 48,398 || 38–36
|- bgcolor="ffbbbb"
| 75 || June 29 || @ Mets || 3–7 || Seaver || Veale (4–9) || — || 27,455 || 38–37
|- bgcolor="ffbbbb"
| 76 || June 30 || Phillies || 2–4 || Fryman || Ellis (4–8) || Boozer || 17,954 || 38–38
|-

|- bgcolor="ffbbbb"
| 77 || July 1 || Phillies || 4–7 || Jackson || Blass (8–5) || Wilson || 6,652 || 38–39
|- bgcolor="ffbbbb"
| 78 || July 2 || Phillies || 4–14 || Raffo || Bunning (7–6) || Boozer || 6,322 || 38–40
|- bgcolor="ffbbbb"
| 79 || July 4 || Mets || 6–11 || Seaver || Veale (4–10) || Koonce ||  || 38–41
|- bgcolor="ffbbbb"
| 80 || July 4 || Mets || 2–9 || Cardwell || Ellis (4–9) || DiLauro || 17,631 || 38–42
|- bgcolor="ffbbbb"
| 81 || July 6 || Mets || 7–8 || Taylor || Hartenstein (2–4) || Koonce || 11,552 || 38–43
|- bgcolor="ccffcc"
| 82 || July 8 || Expos || 8–1 || Blass (9–5) || Wegener || — || 4,930 || 39–43
|- bgcolor="ccffcc"
| 83 || July 9 || Expos || 4–3 (10) || Gibbon (2–0) || Radatz || — ||  || 40–43
|- bgcolor="ccffcc"
| 84 || July 9 || Expos || 3–2 || Ellis (5–9) || Reed || Gibbon (3) || 9,372 || 41–43
|- bgcolor="ccffcc"
| 85 || July 10 || Expos || 2–1 (11) || Hartenstein (3–4) || McGinn || — || 4,982 || 42–43
|- bgcolor="ffbbbb"
| 86 || July 11 || @ Cardinals || 1–6 || Carlton || Walker (0–1) || — || 24,910 || 42–44
|- bgcolor="ffbbbb"
| 87 || July 12 || @ Cardinals || 3–6 || Washburn || Blass (9–6) || — || 17,950 || 42–45
|- bgcolor="ccffcc"
| 88 || July 13 || @ Cardinals || 3–0 || Bunning (8–6) || Gibson || Moose (1) ||  || 43–45
|- bgcolor="ffbbbb"
| 89 || July 13 || @ Cardinals || 2–4 || Briles || Ellis (5–10) || Hoerner || 36,469 || 43–46
|- bgcolor="ffbbbb"
| 90 || July 14 || @ Expos || 0–2 || Stoneman || Veale (4–11) || — || 20,054 || 43–47
|- bgcolor="ccffcc"
| 91 || July 15 || @ Expos || 9–3 || Walker (1–1) || Waslewski || — || 20,876 || 44–47
|- bgcolor="ccffcc"
| 92 || July 16 || @ Expos || 8–7 || Gibbon (3–0) || McGinn || Hartenstein (8) || 24,214 || 45–47
|- bgcolor="ffbbbb"
| 93 || July 17 || @ Expos || 4–5 || Shaw || Bunning (8–7) || — || 11,935 || 45–48
|- bgcolor="ccffcc"
| 94 || July 18 || Cardinals || 4–1 || Ellis (6–10) || Gibson || — || 13,666 || 46–48
|- bgcolor="ccffcc"
| 95 || July 19 || Cardinals || 3–2 || Veale (5–11) || Briles || Gibbon (4) || 8,915 || 47–48
|- bgcolor="ccffcc"
| 96 || July 24 || Padres || 4–3 (10) || Ellis (7–10) || Ross || — || 6,206 || 48–48
|- bgcolor="ffbbbb"
| 97 || July 25 || Padres || 2–3 || Niekro || Blass (9–7) || — || 7,404 || 48–49
|- bgcolor="ccffcc"
| 98 || July 26 || Padres || 4–3 (10) || Moose (7–2) || McCool || — || 6,769 || 49–49
|- bgcolor="ccffcc"
| 99 || July 27 || Padres || 4–1 || Bunning (9–7) || Kirby || Moose (2) || 14,888 || 50–49
|- bgcolor="ccffcc"
| 100 || July 29 || Dodgers || 4–2 (10) || Gibbon (4–0) || McBean || — ||  || 51–49
|- bgcolor="ffbbbb"
| 101 || July 29 || Dodgers || 5–6 || Mikkelsen || Ellis (7–11) || — || 18,436 || 51–50
|- bgcolor="ccffcc"
| 102 || July 30 || Dodgers || 4–2 || Blass (10–7) || Osteen || — || 8,833 || 52–50
|- bgcolor="ccffcc"
| 103 || July 31 || Dodgers || 2–1 (15) || Hartenstein (4–4) || McBean || — || 8,605 || 53–50
|-

|- bgcolor="ffbbbb"
| 104 || August 1 || Giants || 1–5 || McCormick || Bunning (9–8) || — || 10,500 || 53–51
|- bgcolor="ccffcc"
| 105 || August 2 || Giants || 7–3 || Veale (6–11) || Marichal || — || 12,566 || 54–51
|- bgcolor="ffbbbb"
| 106 || August 3 || Giants || 2–3 || Perry || Ellis (7–12) || — || 14,841 || 54–52
|- bgcolor="ccffcc"
| 107 || August 5 || @ Dodgers || 11–3 || Blass (11–7) || Foster || — || 22,604 || 55–52
|- bgcolor="ffbbbb"
| 108 || August 6 || @ Dodgers || 5–7 || Sutton || Walker (1–2) || Brewer || 18,347 || 55–53
|- bgcolor="ffbbbb"
| 109 || August 7 || @ Dodgers || 0–6 || Osteen || Bunning (9–9) || — || 20,475 || 55–54
|- bgcolor="ccffcc"
| 110 || August 8 || @ Padres || 7–1 || Veale (7–11) || Niekro || — || 6,061 || 56–54
|- bgcolor="ccffcc"
| 111 || August 10 || @ Padres || 7–5 || Ellis (8–12) || Kelley || Gibbon (5) ||  || 57–54
|- bgcolor="ccffcc"
| 112 || August 10 || @ Padres || 8–6 || Blass (12–7) || Kirby || Gibbon (6) || 10,073 || 58–54
|- bgcolor="ffbbbb"
| 113 || August 12 || @ Giants || 3–6 || Perry || Walker (1–3) || — || 5,496 || 58–55
|- bgcolor="ccffcc"
| 114 || August 13 || @ Giants || 10–5 || Bunning (10–9) || McCormick || Moose (3) || 5,966 || 59–55
|- bgcolor="ccffcc"
| 115 || August 15 || @ Reds || 5–1 || Veale (8–11) || Nolan || — || 21,314 || 60–55
|- bgcolor="ffbbbb"
| 116 || August 16 || @ Reds || 2–5 || Merritt || Ellis (8–13) || — || 13,218 || 60–56
|- bgcolor="ccffcc"
| 117 || August 17 || @ Reds || 8–5 || Blass (13–7) || Fisher || Hartenstein (9) || 20,732 || 61–56
|- bgcolor="ccffcc"
| 118 || August 18 || @ Reds || 12–5 (10) || Dal Canton (6–2) || Granger || — || 16,657 || 62–56
|- bgcolor="ccffcc"
| 119 || August 19 || Astros || 5–1 || Walker (2–3) || Wilson || Gibbon (7) || 5,409 || 63–56
|- bgcolor="ccffcc"
| 120 || August 20 || Astros || 1–0 || Veale (9–11) || Lemaster || — || 10,563 || 64–56
|- bgcolor="ccffcc"
| 121 || August 22 || Reds || 8–2 || Ellis (9–13) || Fisher || — ||  || 65–56
|- bgcolor="ccffcc"
| 122 || August 22 || Reds || 5–3 || Dal Canton (7–2) || Carroll || — || 28,184 || 66–56
|- bgcolor="ccffcc"
| 123 || August 23 || Reds || 3–1 || Moose (8–2) || Arrigo || Hartenstein (10) || 16,283 || 67–56
|- bgcolor="ccffcc"
| 124 || August 24 || Reds || 9–4 || Veale (10–11) || Maloney || Dal Canton (4) || 16,506 || 68–56
|- bgcolor="ffbbbb"
| 125 || August 26 || Braves || 4–6 || Reed || Walker (2–4) || Doyle || 15,449 || 68–57
|- bgcolor="ffbbbb"
| 126 || August 27 || Braves || 0–1 || Niekro || Ellis (9–14) || — || 11,454 || 68–58
|- bgcolor="ffbbbb"
| 127 || August 28 || Braves || 2–8 || Stone || Blass (13–8) || Doyle || 10,767 || 68–59
|- bgcolor="ccffcc"
| 128 || August 29 || @ Astros || 4–2 (10) || Moose (9–2) || Bouton || — || 20,405 || 69–59
|- bgcolor="ffbbbb"
| 129 || August 30 || @ Astros || 1–2 || Dierker || Belinsky (0–1) || — || 27,747 || 69–60
|- bgcolor="ccffcc"
| 130 || August 31 || @ Astros || 6–4 || Marone (1–1) || Gladding || Blass (2) || 24,722 || 70–60
|-

|- bgcolor="ccffcc"
| 131 || September 1 || @ Braves || 7–1 || Moose (10–2) || Britton || — || 10,479 || 71–60
|- bgcolor="ffbbbb"
| 132 || September 3 || @ Braves || 1–8 || Reed || Ellis (9–15) || Upshaw || 6,317 || 71–61
|- bgcolor="ccffcc"
| 133 || September 5 || @ Cubs || 9–2 || Blass (14–8) || Holtzman || — || 10,411 || 72–61
|- bgcolor="ccffcc"
| 134 || September 6 || @ Cubs || 13–4 || Veale (11–11) || Jenkins || — || 24,566 || 73–61
|- bgcolor="ccffcc"
| 135 || September 7 || @ Cubs || 7–5 (11) || Dal Canton (8–2) || Johnson || — || 28,698 || 74–61
|- bgcolor="ccffcc"
| 136 || September 8 || @ Expos || 6–2 || Hartenstein (5–4) || Raymond || Dal Canton (5) || 9,526 || 75–61
|- bgcolor="ffbbbb"
| 137 || September 9 || @ Expos || 2–4 || Renko || Walker (2–5) || — || 9,129 || 75–62
|- bgcolor="ffbbbb"
| 138 || September 10 || Cardinals || 2–11 || Gibson || Blass (14–9) || — ||  || 75–63
|- bgcolor="ffbbbb"
| 139 || September 10 || Cardinals || 1–2 || Torrez || Belinsky (0–2) || Grant || 11,898 || 75–64
|- bgcolor="ccffcc"
| 140 || September 11 || Cardinals || 3–2 || Veale (12–11) || Carlton || — || 4,579 || 76–64
|- bgcolor="ffbbbb"
| 141 || September 12 || Mets || 0–1 || Koosman || Moose (10–3) || — ||  || 76–65
|- bgcolor="ffbbbb"
| 142 || September 12 || Mets || 0–1 || Cardwell || Ellis (9–16) || McGraw || 19,303 || 76–66
|- bgcolor="ffbbbb"
| 143 || September 13 || Mets || 2–5 || Seaver || Walker (2–6) || — || 10,440 || 76–67
|- bgcolor="ccffcc"
| 144 || September 14 || Mets || 5–3 || Blass (15–9) || Ryan || — || 11,324 || 77–67
|- bgcolor="ffbbbb"
| 145 || September 15 || @ Phillies || 1–2 || Wise || Veale (12–12) || — ||  || 77–68
|- bgcolor="ffbbbb"
| 146 || September 15 || @ Phillies || 3–4 || James || Belinsky (0–3) || — || 2,933 || 77–69
|- bgcolor="ccffcc"
| 147 || September 16 || @ Phillies || 9–5 || Moose (11–3) || Fryman || Gibbon (8) || 1,169 || 78–69
|- bgcolor="ccffcc"
| 148 || September 17 || @ Cardinals || 4–2 || Ellis (10–16) || Taylor || — || 11,646 || 79–69
|- bgcolor="ffbbbb"
| 149 || September 18 || @ Cardinals || 7–8 || Campisi || Gibbon (4–1) || — || 8,612 || 79–70
|- bgcolor="ccffcc"
| 150 || September 19 || @ Mets || 8–2 || Veale (13–12) || Ryan || — ||  || 80–70
|- bgcolor="ccffcc"
| 151 || September 19 || @ Mets || 8–0 || Walker (3–6) || McAndrew || — || 51,885 || 81–70
|- bgcolor="ccffcc"
| 152 || September 20 || @ Mets || 4–0 || Moose (12–3) || Gentry || — || 38,784 || 82–70
|- bgcolor="ffbbbb"
| 153 || September 21 || @ Mets || 3–5 || Koosman || Ellis (10–17) || — ||  || 82–71
|- bgcolor="ffbbbb"
| 154 || September 21 || @ Mets || 1–6 || Cardwell || Blass (15–10) || — || 55,901 || 82–72
|- bgcolor="ffbbbb"
| 155 || September 23 || Phillies || 3–4 || Jackson || Veale (13–13) || Johnson || 2,364 || 82–73
|- bgcolor="ccffcc"
| 156 || September 25 || Phillies || 5–3 || Walker (4–6) || Wise || — ||  || 83–73
|- bgcolor="ccffcc"
| 157 || September 25 || Phillies || 9–7 || Moose (13–3) || James || Gibbon (9) || 2,379 || 84–73
|- bgcolor="ccffcc"
| 158 || September 26 || Cubs || 2–0 || Ellis (11–17) || Jenkins || — || 4,973 || 85–73
|- bgcolor="ccffcc"
| 159 || September 27 || Cubs || 4–1 || Blass (16–10) || Holtzman || Moose (4) || 4,157 || 86–73
|- bgcolor="ffbbbb"
| 160 || September 28 || Cubs || 1–3 || Hands || Veale (13–14) || — || 24,435 || 86–74
|-

|- bgcolor="ccffcc"
| 161 || October 1 || Expos || 5–4 || Gibbon (5–1) || Reed || — || 2,496 || 87–74
|- bgcolor="ccffcc"
| 162 || October 2 || Expos || 8–2 || Moose (14–3) || Robertson || — || 2,700 || 88–74
|-

|-
| Legend:       = Win       = LossBold = Pirates team member

Opening Day lineup

Notable transactions 
 May 17, 1969: Jim Shellenback was traded by the Pirates to the Washington Senators in exchange for Frank Kreutzer.
 June 5, 1969: Pedro Ramos was released by the Pirates.
 June 10, 1969: Ron Kline was traded by the Pirates to the San Francisco Giants for Joe Gibbon.
 July 16, 1969: Kent Tekulve was signed by the Pirates as a non-drafted free agent.
 July 30, 1969: Bo Belinsky was purchased by the Pirates from the California Angels.
 August 15, 1969: Jim Bunning was traded by the Pirates to the Los Angeles Dodgers for Ron Mitchell, Chuck Goggin and cash.
 September 26, 1969: Manager Larry Shepard fired by the Pirates. Alex Grammas named interim manager for the final five games.

Roster

Statistics
Batting
Note: G = Games played; AB = At bats; H = Hits; Avg. = Batting average; HR = Home runs; RBI = Runs batted in

Pitching
Note: G = Games pitched; IP = Innings pitched; W = Wins; L = Losses; ERA = Earned run average; SO = Strikeouts

Farm system 

LEAGUE CHAMPIONS: York

Notes

References 
 1969 Pittsburgh Pirates at Baseball Reference
 1969 Pittsburgh Pirates at Baseball Almanac

Pittsburgh Pirates seasons
Pittsburgh Pirates season
Pittsburg